G*Power is a free-to use software used to calculate statistical power. The program offers the ability to calculate power for a wide variety of statistical tests including t-tests, F-tests, and chi-square-tests, among others. Additionally, the user must determine which of the many contexts this test is being used, such as a one-way ANOVA versus a multi-way ANOVA. In order to calculate power, the user must know four of five variables: either number of groups, number of observations, effect size, significance level (α), or power (1-β). G*Power has a built-in tool for determining effect size if it cannot be estimated from prior literature or is not easily calculable.

References

Further reading
 Faul, F., Erdfelder, E., Lang, A., & Buchner, A. (2007). G*Power 3: A flexible statistical power analysis program for the social, behavioral, and biomedical sciences. Behavior Research Methods, 39(2), 175-191. doi:10.3758/bf03193146
 Faul, F., Erdfelder, E., Buchner, A., & Lang, A. (2009). Statistical power analyses using G*Power 3.1: Tests for correlation and regression analyses. Behavior Research Methods, 41(4), 1149-1160. doi:10.3758/brm.41.4.1149

External links
 G*Power homepage

Statistical software